Fabio Babini (born 3 November 1969) is an Italian professional racing driver.

Born in Faenza, Babini competed in the FIA GT Championship from 2000 until 2004 and in one race of the American Le Mans Series each year from 2001 to 2003.

From 1990 until 1992 he raced in Italian Formula Three, becoming a test driver in 1994 for the Reynard team, before moving to the Italian GT Series from 1995 until 1997. Other series he has raced in include Russian Formula Three (1997–1999) and the Grand-Am Rolex Sports Car Series (2000–2001).

24 Hours of Le Mans results

References 
 Fia GT – Fabio Babini

1969 births
Italian racing drivers
Living people
FIA GT Championship drivers
Rolex Sports Car Series drivers
Italian Formula Three Championship drivers
24 Hours of Le Mans drivers
People from Faenza
American Le Mans Series drivers
European Le Mans Series drivers
International GT Open drivers
Blancpain Endurance Series drivers
24 Hours of Spa drivers
Asian Le Mans Series drivers
WeatherTech SportsCar Championship drivers
24 Hours of Daytona drivers
Sportspeople from the Province of Ravenna

Aston Martin Racing drivers
SMP Racing drivers
AF Corse drivers
Cheever Racing drivers
24H Series drivers
Le Mans Cup drivers